Omar Jagaa is a town in the Arta Region of Djibouti. It is the primary transportation hub in western Djibouti via highway. The town is situated in a small valley.

References
Omar Jaga: One of the "nowhere" schools of Djibouti
FFDJ : Inauguration d’une bibliothèque pour les élèves du collège d’Omar Jagaa
Inauguration de la nouvelle bibliothèque du collège Omar Jaga’a (région d’Arta), le 22/09/2020
Les FFDJ inaugurent la création d’une bibliothèque pour les élèves du collège d’Omar Jagaa

Arta Region
Populated places in Djibouti